Harold Sturtevant was a sailor in the United States Navy. In January 1941, he and fellow sailor E.C. Lackey climbed up the fire escape of the building which housed the German consulate in San Francisco, California and slashed and tore down the flag of Nazi Germany which was flying there in honor of the  7th anniversary of the founding of the Third Reich. The two men were arrested, tried, court martialed for malicious mischief and received a dishonorable discharge from the Navy. The German Foreign Ministry protested the incident and the United States Department of State expressed their regrets. Later that year, after Germany declared war on the United States, Sturtevant received a pardon and reenlisted in the Navy.

References

See also
Second World War
Flag desecration

United States Navy sailors
Protests in the United States
United States Navy personnel of World War II
American anti-fascists
Events in California
Politics of San Francisco
Year of birth missing
Year of death missing